Liang Hongyu (born 23 October 1990) is a Chinese professional racing cyclist, who last rode for UCI Women's Team . She is from Heilongjiang.

She won a bronze medal at the 2019 Military World Games.

See also
 List of 2015 UCI Women's Teams and riders

References

External links
 

1990 births
Living people
Chinese female cyclists
Cyclists from Heilongjiang
Cyclists at the 2018 Asian Games
Asian Games competitors for China
21st-century Chinese women